Riley is a transferred use of an English surname derived from Old English ryge ‘rye’ + lēah ‘wood’, ‘clearing’.  

It is also derived from the Irish surname O'Reilly,  which originated from the Irish name Raghallach, of unknown meaning.

Regional variations

Europe 
In the United Kingdom, it is still primarily a boy's name, and was the 40th most popular name for boys in 2016.

United States 
Until the 1990s and early 2000s, Riley was primarily a boy's name in the United States. However, it has become a popular name for girls in the United States and remains in wide use there for girls, with many variant spellings also in use, including Reiley, Reilly, Reily,  Rhilee, Rhiley,  Rhylee, Rhylei, Rhyleigh, Rhyley, Rhyli, Rhylie, Rielee,  Rilee, Rileigh, Rilie, Ryelee, Rylea, Rylee, Rylei, Ryleigh, Ryley, Ryli, Rylie, Ryliee, and Ryliegh.    It also remains a well-used name there for boys, also with variant spellings.

Notable men with this given name

A
Riley Adams (born 1996), American baseball player
Riley Armstrong (ice hockey) (born 1984), Canadian ice hockey player and coach
Riley Armstrong (musician) (born 1976), Canadian singer-songwriter
Riley Ayre (born 1996), Australian cricketer

B
Riley Barber (born 1994), American ice hockey player
Riley Bartholomew (1807–1894), American politician and pioneer
Riley Baugus, American guitarist
Riley P. Bechtel (born 1952), American businessman
Riley A. Bender (1890–1973), American businessman and politician
Riley Bidois (born 2002), New Zealand footballer
Riley Biggs (1900–1971), American football player
Riley Bonner (born 1997), Australian rules footballer
Riley Breckenridge (born 1975), American musician
Riley Brett (1895–1982), American race car driver
Riley Brockington (born 1975), Canadian politician
Riley Brown (born 1984), Australian rugby union footballer
Riley Bullough (born 1993), American football player

C
Riley Chamberlin (1852–1917), American actor
Riley Cooper (born 1987), American football player
Riley Cote (born 1982), Canadian ice hockey player

D
Riley Damiani (born 2000), Canadian ice hockey player
Riley Darnell (1940–2020), American lawyer and politician
Riley Dean (born 2001), Irish rugby union footballer
Riley Dixon (born 1993), American football player
Riley Dodge (born 1988), American football player
Riley Dolezal (born 1985), American javelin thrower

E
Riley Etheridge Jr., American singer-songwriter

F
Riley Ferguson (born 1995), American football player
Riley Ferrell (born 1993), American baseball player
Riley Fitzsimmons (born 1996), Australian canoeist

G
Riley Gardner (1921–2007), American psychologist
Riley Gibbs (born 1996), American sailor
Riley Gill (born 1985), American ice hockey player
Riley Grant (born 1995), American soccer player
Riley Green (singer) (born 1988), American singer-songwriter
Riley Greene (born 2000), American baseball player
Riley Griffiths (born 1997), American football player

H
Riley Harbottle (born 2000), English footballer
Riley Hatch (1862–1925), American singer
Riley Hawk (born 1992), American skateboarder
Riley Hekure (born 1994), Papua New Guinean cricketer
Riley Herbst (born 1999), American stock car racing driver
Riley Hern (1878–1929), Canadian ice hockey player
Riley Higgins (born 2002), New Zealand rugby union footballer
Riley Hill (actor) (1914–1993), American actor
Riley Holzapfel (born 1988), Canadian ice hockey player
Riley D. Housewright (1913–2003), American microbiologist

I
Riley Ingram (born 1941), American politician

J
Riley Janes (born 1980), Canadian swimmer
Riley Jones, English actor

K
Riley Keaton (born 1997), American politician
Riley Knight (born 1995), Australian rules footballer
Riley B. King American blues artist

L
Riley Lee (born 1951), American-Australian shakuhachi player
Riley Leonard (born 2002), American football player
Riley Loos (born 2000), American gymnast

M
Riley Martin (1946–2015), American author
Riley Matheson (1914–1987), American football player
Riley Mattson (born 1938), American football player
Riley McCarron (born 1993), American football player
Riley McCormick (born 1991), Canadian diver
Riley McGovern (born 1991), American soccer player
Riley McGree (born 1998), Australian footballer
Riley Meredith (born 1996), Australian cricketer
Riley Carter Millington (born 1993/1994), English actor
Riley Milne (born 1990), Australian rules footballer
Riley Moore (born 1980/1981), American politician
Riley Morris (1935–2017), American football player
Riley Moss (born 2000), American football player

N
Riley Nash (born 1989), Canadian ice hockey player
Riley Nelson (born 1977), Canadian ice hockey player
Riley Dobi Noel (1972–2004), American murderer
Riley Nottingham (born 1991), Australian actor

O
Riley O'Brien (born 1995), American baseball player
Riley O'Neill (born 1985), Canadian footballer
Riley Odoms (born 1950), American football player

P
Riley Parsons (born 2000), English snooker player
Riley Patterson (born 1998), American football player
Riley Pint (born 1997), American baseball player
Riley L. Pitts (1937–1967), American soldier
Riley Puckett (1894–1946), American musician

R
Riley Reiff (born 1988), American football player
Riley Ridley (born 1996), American football player
Riley Edward Robinson (1847–1921), English minister
Riley Rossmo, Canadian comic book artist

S
Riley Salmon (born 1976), American volleyball player
Riley Schmidt (born 1976), American actor
Riley Senft (born 1979), Canadian humanitarian
Riley Sheahan (born 1991), Canadian ice hockey player
Riley Shepard (1918–2009), American musician
Riley Skinner (born 1986), American football player
Riley Smith (born 1978), American actor
Riley Smith (American football) (1911–1999), American football player
Riley Stearns (born 1986), American filmmaker
Riley Stewart (1919–2000), American baseball player
Riley Stillman (born 1998), Canadian ice hockey player
Riley E. Stratton (1823–1866), American attorney
Riley Swanson (born 1984), American attorney

T
Riley Thilthorpe (born 2002), Australian rules footballer
Riley Thomson (1912–1960), American animator
Riley Tufte (born 1998), American ice hockey player

U
Riley Uggla (born 1995), British-Canadian designer

V
Riley Voelkel (born 1990), American-Canadian actress

W
Riley Wallace (born 1941), American basketball coach
Riley "Special" Wallace (born 1983), Canadian musician
Riley Wang (born 1996), Canadian-Taiwanese actor
Riley Ware (born 1962), American football player
Riley Warland (born 2002), Australian footballer
Riley Watson (1859–1915), English doctor
Riley Weselowski (born 1985), Canadian ice hockey player
Riley J. Wilson (1871–1946), American attorney and legislator
Riley Woodcock (born 1995), Australian footballer

Y
Riley S. Young (1860–1952), American politician

Notable women with this given name 

Riley Clemmons (born 1999), American musician
Riley Day (born 2000), Australian sprinter
Riley Hoover (born 1998), Guamanian-American footballer
Riley Keough (born 1989), American actress
Riley Mants (born 1978), Canadian swimmer
Riley McCusker (born 2001), American artistic gymnast
Riley Montana (born 1990), American fashion model
Riley Redgate, American author
Riley Reid (born 1991), American pornographic actress
Riley Schillaci (born 1982), American performance artist
Riley Steele (born 1987), American pornographic actress
Riley Weston (born 1966), American actress

Fictional male characters
Riley Biers, a character in the novel series The Twilight Saga
Riley Finn, character in the television series Buffy the Vampire Slayer
Riley Freeman, character in the animated television series The Boondocks
Riley Parker, a character in Neighbours
Riley is also the name of the playable dog character in Call Of Duty: Ghosts

Fictional female characters 
Riley Abel, a character in the video game The Last of Us: Left Behind
Riley Andersen, a character in the film Inside Out
Riley Blue, a character in the Netflix series  Sense8
Riley Daring, a character in The Replacements
Riley Dawson, character in the television series Terminator: The Sarah Connor Chronicles
Riley Matthews, a character in the Disney Channel spinoff series Girl Meets World

See also
Riley (surname), a page for people with the surname "Riley"

Notes

English feminine given names
English masculine given names
English given names
English unisex given names